All Dirt Roads Taste of Salt is a 2023 American drama film, written and directed by Raven Jackson. It stars Charleen McClure, Moses Ingram, Sheila Atim, and Chris Chalk. Barry Jenkins serves as a producer under his Pastel banner.

It had its world premiere in the U.S. Dramatic competition at the 2023 Sundance Film Festival on January 22, 2023.

Plot
The film charts the growth, loves, and heartbreaks of a Black woman in Mississippi, from her childhood through her adult years.

Cast
 Charleen McClure as Mack
 Moses Ingram as Josie
 Kaylee Nicole Johnson as young Mack
 Reginald Helms Jr. as Wood
 Sheila Atim as Evelyn
 Chris Chalk as Isaiah
 Jayah Henry as young Josie
 Zainab Jah as older Mack
Source:

Production
In February 2021, it was announced that Raven Jackson would write and direct the film, with Barry Jenkins set to serve as a producer under his Pastel banner, and A24 set to produce and distribute.

Principal photography took place in Tennessee and in Vicksburg and Jackson, Mississippi in the fall of 2021.

Release
The film had its world premiere at the 2023 Sundance Film Festival on January 22, 2023.

Reception 
On review aggregator website Rotten Tomatoes, the film has an approval rating of 100% based on 24 reviews, with an average rating of 7.9/10. On Metacritic, the film has a weighted average of 85 out of 100 based on 11 critic reviews, indicating "universal acclaim".

References

External links
 

2023 films
2023 directorial debut films
2023 independent films
American drama films
A24 (company) films
Films shot in Tennessee
Films shot in Mississippi